Sten-Ove Ramberg (born 20 November 1955), also known as Putte Ramberg, is a Swedish retired footballer. He made 250 league appearances for Hammarby IF and scored 14 goals. He also made 27 appearances for the Swedish national side, scoring three times.

Being known as a technically gifted central midfielder, he started his career at IF Brommapojkarna in the lower divisions. Later he went on to play eleven years in Allsvenskan for Hammarby.

In 2004, he was voted as the seventh best player ever in Hammarby's history. In 2015, he also got inducted to the Hall of Fame at Brommapojkarna.

Ramberg was also a gifted player in the sport of bandy, representing Hammarby IF Bandy whilst still being an active footballer. In 1978, he also earned two caps for the Swedish national bandy team.

After ending his football career, Ramberg went on to work as an assistant manager at Brommapojkarna between 1993 and 1996. Since the beginning of the 2000s he has worked at the state owned gambling company Svenska Spel, managing their popular football product called "Stryktipset".

References

Swedish footballers
Hammarby Fotboll players
IF Brommapojkarna players
1955 births
Living people
Sweden international footballers
Swedish bandy players
Allsvenskan players
Hammarby IF Bandy players
Association football midfielders
Footballers from Stockholm